Timothy C. Crowder (born June 30, 1985) is a former American football defensive end. He was drafted by the Denver Broncos in the second round of the 2007 NFL Draft. He played college football at Texas.

Crowder has also played for the Tampa Bay Buccaneers.

Early years
Crowder attended John Tyler High School and was coached by Kelvin Ratliff. He primarily played defensive end and posted 127 tackles, 22 tackles for loss (TFLs) and 14 sacks in his final two seasons.

College career
Crowder played college football for the University of Texas Longhorns. As a freshman, Crowder played in all 13 games and started 9 at left defensive end. For the season, he recorded 35 tackles, 3 TFLs, one sack, one interception, 14 pressures, five passes deflected and two forced fumbles. Following the season, he was named third-team Freshman All America by the Sporting News and shared UT's Outstanding Newcomer of the Year award. As a sophomore, he started all 12 games at left defensive end. For the season, he recorded 47 tackles, 10 TFLs, one forced fumble, 4.5 sacks, and 22 quarterback pressures. He was named honorable mention All-Big 12 by the Associated Press. As a junior in 2005, he started all 13 games at left defensive end. He led the team with 20 QB pressures, while recording 50 tackles, nine TFLs, three sacks, an interception and, a forced fumble. He was a first-team All-Big 12 selection by the league's coaches, a second-team All-Big 12 selection by The Kansas City Star, an honorable mention All-Big 12 pick by the Associated Press, and a member of the Ted Hendricks Award watch list.

Professional career

Denver Broncos
Crowder was selected in the second round (56th overall) of the 2007 NFL Draft by the Denver Broncos.  He was the second defensive end selected by the club in that draft, and the second player to come from a recent BCS Championship team.
He finished his rookie year starting 13 games, 16 tackles, 1 forced fumble and 4.0 sacks.

He was waived by the Broncos on September 5, 2009.

Tampa Bay Buccaneers
Crowder was signed by the Tampa Bay Buccaneers on September 14, 2009. He was released on March 22, 2012.

References

External links
Texas Longhorns bio

1985 births
Living people
Sportspeople from Tyler, Texas
Players of American football from Texas
American football defensive ends
Texas Longhorns football players
Denver Broncos players
Tampa Bay Buccaneers players